Afton Township is a township in Sanborn County, South Dakota, United States.

References

Townships in Sanborn County, South Dakota
Townships in South Dakota